Olginskoye is a rural locality (a village) in Kaltovsky Selsoviet, Iglinsky District, Bashkortostan, Russia. The population was 46 as of 2010. There is 1 street.

Geography 
Olginskoye is located 30 km southeast of Iglino (the district's administrative centre) by road. Leninsky is the nearest rural locality.

References 

Rural localities in Iglinsky District